Jean Parker was an American film, stage, and television actress whose career spanned over three decades, beginning in the pre-code era. She made her feature debut in 1932's Divorce in the Family, followed by an uncredited bit part in Rasputin and the Empress (1932). Parker had her breakthrough role opposite Katharine Hepburn and Joan Bennett in George Cukor's Little Women (1933), portraying Elizabeth March. She subsequently starred in Frank Capra's comedy-mystery Lady for a Day (also 1933), followed by the romantic comedy The Ghost Goes West (1935).

Parker continued to star in films through the 1940s, notably opposite Lon Chaney in Dead Man's Eyes (1944), and in the film noir Bluebeard (1944). Beginning in 1946, Parker appeared on Broadway in the original production of Born Yesterday. She appeared in two additional Broadway productions after: Loco (1946), in the title role, and Burlesque (1946–1947).

By the 1950s, Parker's career had slowed, though she appeared in a small number of films, such as The Gunfighter (1950) and Those Redheads from Seattle (1953). She made her final film appearance in 1965's Apache Uprising before retiring from acting.

Film

Television

Stage

References

Sources

Actress filmographies
American filmographies